Oshindobe is a village situated in northern part of Namibia in the Ohangwena Region. The village is named after the lake called Ondobe during its discovery, an elderly revealed. It is situated on the very edge of the Owambo region (sometimes called the '4 O's region'). Oshindobe is located on the Cuvelai-Etosha basin which is part of  transboundary catchment shared by Angola and Namibia. The climate in this village is semi-arid and impacted by high rainfall variability which leads to regular droughts and floods. The two main sources of water for this region emanate from Angola: from the upper part of the Cuvelai Basin, and pipe water line (Epumbu-Omadenga water pipeline) which occasionally provides drinking water. In most cases people are dependent on hand-dug wells and 'omifimas' (i.e Omufima wa tate Namwenyo, Omufima wa tatekulu Hashiti and many more) and seasonal flows of shallow water (Efundja) in Oshana (Oshana sha shaNguulu) between Oshindobe Village and Eengwena. Community people of Oshindobe village and Eengwena village in 1992 managed to dig  a lake between these two villages that will store water until next rain season although this lake faces higher evaporation rates. The Oshindobe village is also faced with soil degradation, loss of grazing area, and unequal land distribution. 

The first thing that is unique about this village is the abundance of people, unlike the rest of the country. People, livestock, shebeens (bars) and markets are everywhere, seemingly all existing harmoniously in an unplanned order.

Location
The village Oshindobe is surrounded by the neighboring villages of Oshali, Okaku, Oikokola-North, Eengwena, Okambebe and Ondobe Yomunghudi. It is 45 km (43 minutes driving north of Oshakati), approximately 36.6 km (39 minutes driving west of Oshikango) and approximately 9 km from the Angolan-Namibia border (9 minutes driving). The village falls under Oukwanyama traditional authority in the Ohaingu section and it is part of the Ongenga constituency with Leonard Shimutwikeni (SWAPO) as a councilor from 1990s who was succeeded by Sackaria Haimunghudi (Nov 2016). The headman of Oshindobe village is Lucas Shilumbu Vaendwanawa who inherited it from his grandfather Komeya.

Description
The village hosts about 4,500 inhabitants who depends on agriculture and informal sector for subsistence. societal problems mainly arise from and are reflected by the disparities in income distribution, unemployment and poverty. 80% of Oshindobe village's population live below poverty threshold. Government of Namibia on many occasions has critically failed to enhance the communal subsistence and the integration of Oshindobe community into the mainstream national cash economy as well as for the empowerment of people's living standards. Children of Oshindobe village attend school at Immanuel-Uahengo Combined School (previously Okamukwa Primary School, 4km south-east of Oshindobe) and Oikokola Combined School(4km due west of Oshindobe). These schools serves most of the lower primary and junior secondary learners. Onashinge Kindergarten school which is the only school in the village is  attended under the famous Omutaku tree. Although the Onashinge Kindergarten is underdeveloped, with no furniture and stationer, matters concerning the education and socialization of children are no exception and thus as we speak Onashinge Kindergarten has helped  the production of village's Scientists, Engineers, teachers, Artisans and many more.   Entrepreneurs have established businesses such as open markets, bottle stores and other minor developments like pounding machines. Essential services, like clinics and church services (ELCIN), are found at Okambebe a nearby 8 km settlement. Several houses in Oshindobe are electrified with NORED electricity and rural water scheme.

Reference

Populated places in the Ohangwena Region